In enzymology, a valine—tRNA ligase is an enzyme that catalyzes the chemical reaction

ATP + L-valine + tRNAVal  AMP + diphosphate + L-valyl-tRNAVal

The 3 substrates of this enzyme are ATP, L-valine, and tRNA(Val), whereas its 3 products are AMP, diphosphate, and L-valyl-tRNA(Val).

This enzyme belongs to the family of ligases, to be specific those forming carbon-oxygen bonds in aminoacyl-tRNA and related compounds.  The systematic name of this enzyme class is L-valine:tRNAVal ligase (AMP-forming). Other names in common use include valyl-tRNA synthetase, valyl-transfer ribonucleate synthetase, valyl-transfer RNA synthetase, valyl-transfer ribonucleic acid synthetase, valine transfer ribonucleate ligase, and valine translase.  This enzyme participates in valine, leucine and isoleucine biosynthesis and aminoacyl-trna biosynthesis.

Structural studies

See also
VARS

References

 
 

EC 6.1.1
Enzymes of known structure